John Vincent Pritchard (born 29 September 1995) is an English professional footballer who plays as a  defender or midfielder for Ashton United.

Playing career
Pritchard was in his youth a trainee by Manchester United, before joined in April 2012 to Oldham Athletic. He made his debut for Oldham Athletic on 21 December 2013 in a 2–0 defeat to Colchester United at Boundary Park, he came on as a 79th-minute substitute for Adam Rooney. After two seasons was released and joined in August 2014 to FC United of Manchester of the Northern Premier League Premier Division.

Limited opportunities at FCUM saw him drop one division to Trafford at the turn of the year. Further moves around the Northern Premier League include New Mills in October 2015, Ramsbottom United in November 2015, Northwich Victoria in July 2016 and Ashton United at the start of the 2017–18 season. While at Ashton United, he spent time on loans with Stockport Town and West Didsbury & Chorlton during autumn 2017, to regain fitness after weeks out with a broken ankle.

On 25 June 2018, Pritchard joined National League North side Chester. On 30 November 2018, Pritchard moved on loan to Buxton F.C. for 28 days to find more regular football. On 31 December, the loan was extended to the end of the season.

In June 2019 he rejoined Ashton United.

Statistics

References

External links

1995 births
Living people
Footballers from Manchester
English footballers
Association football forwards
Oldham Athletic A.F.C. players
English Football League players
Ramsbottom United F.C. players
F.C. United of Manchester players
New Mills A.F.C. players
Trafford F.C. players
Ashton United F.C. players
Chester F.C. players
Buxton F.C. players
West Didsbury & Chorlton A.F.C. players